Valdís Óskarsdóttir (born 1949 in Akureyri, Iceland) is an Icelandic film editor, whose work includes The Celebration, Les Misérables, Finding Forrester and Eternal Sunshine of the Spotless Mind.

She received multiple awards in early 2005 for her work on Eternal Sunshine of the Spotless Mind. In addition, she has twice won the Danish Film Academy's Robert Award for Best Editing.

Sveitabrúðkaup,  her directorial debut, premiered in Iceland in August 2008.

Filmography
Valdís was the primary editor on the following films, unless noted otherwise.
Remote Control (Sódóma Reykjavík) (1992)
The Biggest Heroes (De største helte) (1996)
Dream Hunters (Draumadísir) (1996)
The Last Viking (Den sidste viking) (1997)
The Dance (Dansinn) (1998)
The Celebration (Festen) (1998)
Les Misérables (1998) (additional editor)
Julien Donkey-Boy (1999)
Mifune's Last Song (Mifunes sidste sang) (1999)
Finding Forrester (2000)
Labyrinth (Labyrinten) (2000) (miniseries)
When the Sun Goes Down (Solen er så rød) (2000)
Bear's Kiss (2002) (consulting editor)
The Sea (Hafið) (2002)
Sweet Dreams (Skagerrak) (2003)
It's All About Love (2003)
Toss-Up (Yazi tura) (2004) (with Uğur Yücel)
Eternal Sunshine of the Spotless Mind (2004)
Mister Lonely (2005)
Overcoming (2005)
A Man Comes Home (En mand kommer hjem) (2007)
Mongol (Монгол) (2007) (with Zach Staenberg)
Country Wedding (Sveitabrúðkaup) (2008) (also director and screenwriter)
Vantage Point (2008) (replaced by Stuart Baird and credited as additional editor)
Metalhead (2013)
Lost River (2014) (co-edited with Nico Leunen)
A Beautiful Now (2015) (co-edited with Adam H. Mack)
Autumn Lights (2016)
Kursk (2018)
Flag Day (2021)

Awards and nominations

ACE Awards
Eternal Sunshine of the Spotless Mind (2004), nominated (Best Edited Feature Film – Comedy or Musical)

BAFTA Awards
Eternal Sunshine of the Spotless Mind (2004), won

Danish Film Academy Awards
The Celebration (1998), won
Mifune's Last Song (1999), won

Edda Awards
The Sea (2002), won

Golden Orange Awards
Toss-Up (Yazi tura) (2004), won

Online Film Critics Society Awards
Eternal Sunshine of the Spotless Mind (2004), won

San Diego Film Critics Society Awards
Eternal Sunshine of the Spotless Mind (2004), won

External links
Official Site
 

1950 births
Living people
Best Editing BAFTA Award winners
Icelandic film editors
People from Akureyri